Carlos Marryatt (born 11 October 1968) is a New Zealand cyclist. He competed in the team pursuit at the 1992 Summer Olympics.

References

External links
 

1968 births
Living people
New Zealand male cyclists
Olympic cyclists of New Zealand
Cyclists at the 1992 Summer Olympics
Cyclists from Christchurch